The FIBA 3x3 Africa Cup had its inaugural tournament in 2017 in Lomé, Togo. There are three events in this tournament: men's tournament, women's tournament, and shoot-out contest.

Results

Men's tournament

Women's tournament

References

External links
 2019 Tournament
 2018 Tournament
 2017 Tournament

Basketball competitions in Africa between national teams
3x3 basketball competitions
African championships
Recurring sporting events established in 2017
2017 establishments in Africa